Alice Ho Miu Ling Nethersole Hospital (AHNH) is an acute district general hospital managed under the New Territories East Cluster of the Hospital Authority in Hong Kong. Established by the former London Missionary Society in 1887, it was the first teaching hospital in Hong Kong to train Cantonese locals in Western medical science. It moved to its current location in Tai Po in 1997.

History 
Early in 1881, a Medical Mission Committee, mostly made up of members of the former London Missionary Society, was established to promote Western medicine in Hong Kong. Henry William Davis, chairman of the committee, donated substantially to set up a dispensary in the Tai Ping Shan district at the western end of Hong Kong Island. The dispensary was named after Davis's mother as the Nethersole Dispensary.

Alice Memorial Hospital was opened at 77–81 Hollywood Road on 16 February 1887 under the management of the London Missionary Society. It was the first hospital in Hong Kong to train local Chinese in Western medical science. The hospital structure was built by a donation from Dr. Ho Kai in memory of his wife Alice Walkden. She died of typhoid fever in 1884, two years after her arrival in Hong Kong. In 1889, Dr John C Thomson, a medical missionary, was appointed the hospital's first superintendent.

Due to the shortage of beds at the Alice Memorial Hospital, and at the initiation of Davis, the London Missionary Society established a new hospital at 10 Bonham Road. Opened on 5 September 1893, the hospital was called Nethersole Hospital. It was the first hospital in Hong Kong to train nurses.

As need for maternity beds became clear, a group of prominent Chinese people, including Dr Ho Kai, and Chau Siu-ki, raised funds for building a new hospital. The hospital was opened on 7 July 1904 at 6A Bonham Road and named Alice Memorial Maternity Hospital. It was the first maternity hospital in Hong Kong, and provided midwifery training. It was later merged into Nethersole Hospital.

Shortly after the opening of Alice Memorial Maternity Hospital, a proposal to build another new hospital was raised. Ho Miu-ling, elder sister of Dr Ho Kai and wife of Ng Choy (Wu Ting-fang), agreed to pay the cost of building this hospital. Located at Breezy Path, this new Ho Miu Kwai Hospital, later called Ho Miu Ling Hospital, was opened in 1906. It was a two-storey building with twelve beds, six private rooms and one isolation room. The hospital was also managed by the London Missionary Society.

In 1954, the three hospitals were then amalgamated into the Alice Ho Miu Ling Nethersole Hospital and operated at Breezy Path. The management board of the hospitals was changed from a missionary board to an independent body, the Executive Committee of The Alice Ho Miu Ling Nethersole Hospital.

In 1991, the hospital joined the Hospital Authority to become a public hospital.

In 1993, the Alice Ho Miu Ling Nethersole Hospital moved from Breezy Path to open the new hospital in Chai Wan, which has been known as the Pamela Youde Nethersole Eastern Hospital, under the management of the Hospital Authority.

In 1997, the Alice Ho Miu Ling Nethersole Hospital began to operate at Chuen On Road, Tai Po, New Territories in the completely new hospital premises under the Hospital Authority.

Service 
In-patient Services
 Child & Adolescent Psychiatry
 Emergency Medicine Ward
 Ear, Nose & Throat (ENT)
 Ophthalmology (Eye)
 Intensive Care Unit (ICU)
 Medicine
 Orthopaedics & Traumatology
 Paediatrics & Adolescent Medicine

Day Hospital Service
 Geriatric cum Orthopaedics

Specialist Out-Patient Clinics, Day Surgery and Day Procedure Services
 Anaesthesiology
 Child & Adolescent Mental Health Centre
 Comprehensive Day Rehabilitation Centre
 Combined Endoscopy Unit
 Ear, Nose & Throat (ENT)
 Electro-Medical Diagnostic Unit
 Ophthalmology (Eye)
 Gynaecology
 Integrated ENT Centre
 Medicine
 Medical Centre
 Medical Day Integrated Service Centre
 Mental Health Centre (Rehab Unit)
 Motion Study (Gait) Laboratory
 Oral and Maxillofacial Surgery
 Orthopaedics & Traumatology
 Paediatrics & Adolescent Medicine
 Pain Management Centre
 Renal
 Surgery
 Urology

Community Outreach Services
 Community Nursing Service and Community Geriatric Ambulatory Services

Allied Health Services
 Audiology
 Chaplaincy
 Clinical Pathology
 Clinical Psychology
 Diagnostic Radiology
 Dietetics
 Medical Social Work
 Optometry
 Orthoptics
 Occupational Therapy
 Pharmacy
 Physiotherapy
 Prosthetics and Orthotics
 Speech Therapy
 Podiatry

Logo

The hospital's corporate logo consists of a cross, a heart, and a fountain, representing the spirit of the cross and Christ's love demonstrated to the needy through the care for the physical, psychosocial and spiritual well-being, thus practising the philosophy of holistic healthcare.

Other
In Hong Kong Museum of Medical Sciences, there is a gallery, named as Alice Ho Miu Ling Nethersole Gallery, displaying the historic items from the hospital.

See also
 Tung Wah Hospital
 Seaman's Hospital
 Pamela Youde Nethersole Eastern Hospital

References

External links

 
 Alice Ho Miu Ling Nethersole Charity Foundation

Central, Hong Kong
Hospitals established in 1887
Hospitals in Hong Kong
Medical Services by Protestant Churches in Hong Kong
Tai Po
Maternity hospitals